Jan Kubista (born 23 September 1990 in Prague) is a Czech middle-distance runner competing primarily in the 800 metres. He won the bronze medal in the 4 × 400 metres relay at the 2017 European Indoor Championships. In addition, he represented his country at the 2013 World Championships without advancing from the first round.

His father, also named Jan Kubista, was also a runner. His brother, Vojtěch Kubista, is a professional footballer.

International competitions

Personal bests
Outdoor
400 metres – 47.03 (Tábor 2013)
600 metres – 1:17.11 (Dubnica nad Váhom 2013)
800 metres – 1:46.16 (Ostrava 2013)
1000 metres – 2:19.73 (Ostrava 2014)
1500 metres – 3:51.33 (Vila Real de Santo António 2014)
Indoor
400 metres – 47.45 (Prague 2017)
600 metres – 1:16.59 (Prague 2017)
800 metres – 1:47.61 (Vienna 2017)
1500 metres – 3:50.11 (Prague 2017)

References

All-Athletics profile

1990 births
Living people
Czech male middle-distance runners
Athletes from Prague